The Holmes County Consolidated School District (HCCSD), formerly the Holmes County School District, is a public school district based in Lexington, Mississippi (USA). The district covers all of Holmes County, including the City of Durant area previously served by the Durant Public School District. Effective July 1, 2018 the Holmes County and Durant school districts consolidated into the Holmes County Consolidated School District.

As of 2016 the district had a per student spending rate, adjusted for regional cost differentiation, of $8,368, $3,500 under the U.S. average. The district received, for every student, $1,500 as per Title I. Its student body is among the poorest in the United States.

Schools
High school:
Holmes County Central High School (Grades 9–12; Unincorporated area)
Doretha Draine Wiley Fine Arts Magnet Academy

PreK-8:
William R. Dean, Jr. Elementary School (Grades preK-5; Unincorporated area)
Durant Elementary School (Grades preK-5; Durant)
Goodman-Pickens Elementary School (Grades preK-5; Unincorporated area)
It is between Goodman and Pickens. In 2006 it had about 379 students.
S.V. Marshall Elementary School (Grades preK-8; Unincorporated area)
Williams-Sullivan Middle School (Grades 6-8; Unincorporated area)

Other:
Graduates Within Reach Academy (Tchula)
Career-Technical Center (Lexington)

Former schools:
S.V. Marshall High School (Grades K-5, 9–12, Unincorporated area)
J.J. McClain High School (Grades 6–12, Unincorporated area)
Williams-Sullivan High School (Grades PK-12, Unincorporated area)
Mileston Middle School (Grades 6–8; Mileston, unincorporated area)
Previously Mileston Elementary School (K-6), it housed up to 130 students.
Lexington Elementary School (Grades K-5, Lexington)
In 2006, it had 669 students.

Demographics

2006-07 school year
There were a total of 3,508 students enrolled in the Holmes County School District during the 2006–2007 school year. The gender makeup of the district was 50% female and 50% male. The racial makeup of the district was 99.86% African American, 0.06% White, and 0.09% Asian. 93.2% of the district's students were eligible to receive free lunch.

Previous school years
In 1968 there were 771 white students in the county school system. Desegregation occurred in 1969, and that year the white student population decreased to 228. In 1970 no white students were enrolled.

Accountability statistics

See also
 Alexander v. Holmes County Board of Education
List of school districts in Mississippi

References

External links

Education in Holmes County, Mississippi
School districts in Mississippi
School districts established in 2018